Uyarnthavargal is a 1977 Indian Tamil-language film, directed by T. N. Balu, starring Kamal Haasan and Sujatha. The film deals with a deaf-mute couple and their struggle in society. It is a remake of the 1972 Hindi film Koshish.

Plot 

Aarumugam and Aarthi are deaf-mute. They meet and fall in love and later get married. They get blessed with a child, but the child accidentally dies due to a petty thief. Devastated, Aarumugam and Aarthi's life comes back to normal after their second child is born. They take all cares in bringing up to him to be well educated. Ironically, their employer's daughter is also deaf-mute. They want to get their son married to the employer's daughter, but the son opposes it.

Cast 
Kamal Haasan as Aarumugam
Sujatha as Aarthi
Thengai Srinivasan
Srikanth as the thief
Pandari Bai
Master Sridhar
Typist Gopu
Loose Mohan

Guest actors
Sanjeev Kumar
Prem Nazir
Jaishankar as Sankar
Manorama
M. Balamuralikrishna
Suruli Rajan
S. A. Ashokan

Production 
Uyarnthavargal was produced under production banner Raasleela Pictures.

Soundtrack 
The music was composed by Shankar–Ganesh and lyrics were written by Kannadasan.

Release and reception 
Uyarnthavargal was released on 14 January 1977. Kanthan of Kalki appreciated the film for not having fight sequences or duet songs picturised on the lead characters, considering their deaf-muteness.

References

External links 

1970s Tamil-language films
1977 films
Films about deaf people
Films about disability in India
Films scored by Shankar–Ganesh
Tamil remakes of Hindi films